Anders Engbergs was a dansband in Skara, Sweden, reestablished in 1994 when Lotta & Anders Engbergs orkester divided into two bands, Anders Engbergs and Lotta Engbergs, three years after the divorce of husband Anders Engberg and wife Lotta Engberg. Anders Engbergs had also been the name of the pre-split band prior to Lotta Engberg joining it in 1989. One of the more famous singers in its lineup up to 1988 was Stefan Borsch.

Björn Hedström, who was one of Anders Engbergs' singers, participated in the Swedish Melodifestivalen 1995 with the song "Du är drömmen jag drömt". Anders Engbergs had some Svensktoppen hits, but never achieved the same level of successes as Lotta Engbergs.

Charlotte Perrelli (then known as Charlotte Nilsson) had her breakthrough while in this band, laying the foundation for her later successes in Melodifestivalen as a solo artist.

Another member was Martin Rydnemalm, who later played the guitar and saxophone in Kim & Hallo.

In 1998 the band won the contest "Dansbandslåten" with the song "När kärleken slår till".

Discography

Albums
Glöm inte bort - 1995
Lova mig - 1996

Svensktoppen songs
Glöm inte bort - 1994
Du är drömmen jag drömt - 1995
Ge dej tid - 1995
Glöm inte bort - 1994
Av hela mitt hjärta - 1996
Kärleken i dina ögon - 1998
När kärleken slår till - 1999
Tusen år - 2000

Songs failing to enter the chart
En blå sommardag - 1997
Minnenas värld - 1997
Är du min nu - 1999
Det är sommaren som vaknat - 1999

References

Musical groups established in 1994
Dansbands
1994 establishments in Sweden